Dublin Clontarf may refer to one of two Parliamentary constituencies in Dublin:

 Dublin Clontarf (Dáil constituency) (1977–1981)
 Dublin Clontarf (UK Parliament constituency) (1918–1922)